"Tell Her No" is a hit single written by Rod Argent and included by English rock band the Zombies on their debut album The Zombies in 1965. It peaked at No. 6 on the Billboard Hot 100 chart in the United States in March 1965 and was one of three big American hits by the Zombies (the others being "She's Not There", in 1964, and "Time of the Season", in 1969). "Tell Her No" was only a minor hit for the Zombies in their native Britain, where it peaked at No. 42 on the UK Singles Chart in February 1965.

In 1983, Juice Newton scored a Billboard Top 40 hit in the United States with her version of the song.

Style
According to Argent, "Tell Her No" was influenced by the music of Burt Bacharach and Hal David.  The Rolling Stone Illustrated History of Rock & Roll described it as "a standard Beatles cop" stating that it was "almost as good" as the Zombies' earlier hit single "She's Not There." Music critic Maury Dean described it as a precursor to jazz fusion for the way the song moves in fits and starts and for its polyrhythms.  According to Allmusic critic Lindsay Planer, the song's "quirky instrumental introduction is repeated throughout and practically sounds off-key before it remarkably resolves into the slightly baroque verses."  Planer praised the catchy melody, the tight arrangement and the song's "creative advancement."  Dean called it an "excellent song," especially noting how Rod Argent's keyboards drive it.  Michael Gallucci of Ultimate Classic Rock states that the song doesn't waste a second of its little more than two minutes.

The word "No" is mentioned a total of 63 times in the lyrics.  Lead singer Colin Blunstone mumbled one line in the second refrain and wanted to rerecord it, but producer Ken Jones liked it that way and left it in, leading listeners to wonder what was actually being sung.  Blunstone thinks the words sung were "Don’t love this love from my arms."  Gallucci particularly praised how Blunstone sang the "whoa-oh-oh" a little earlier in the song, during the second verse.

Cover versions
In 1983, country-pop singer Juice Newton recorded a cover of "Tell Her No". Newton reached No. 14 on the US Billboard Hot Adult Contemporary singles chart and No. 27 on the US Billboard Hot 100 chart. She changed the song's lyrical gender and point of view, which significantly altered the song's meaning to being about a woman convincing her man to resist the temptations of a potential adulteress.

Del Shannon also did a take on the song.  Tahiti 80 did a rendition in concert.

References

1964 songs
The Zombies songs
Songs written by Rod Argent
Juice Newton songs
1964 singles
Decca Records singles
Parrot Records singles
Del Shannon songs
1983 singles